WGLN-LP (93.5 FM) is a low power radio station broadcasting a religious radio format. Originally licensed on June 27, 2003, to operate in Cedar Lake, in the U.S. state of Michigan, it first began broadcasting on December 9, 2004. It is licensed to Great Lakes Adventist Academy which uses it in part for teaching Radio broadcasting to high-school students. Each year students produce and air station IDs, public service announcements, informational clips, Christmas music concerts, and other local programming.

Its antenna type is a Nicom BKG77 non-directional, no beam tilt. The station's FRN (FCC Registration Number) is 0007848187, and it has a facility ID of 127139. The station's license was renewed 9/25/2012, with a license expiration of Oct 1, 2020.

The station was originally licensed at the same location for 94 watts of effective radiated power with an antenna located at 98 feet, with the antenna mounted on one side of the water tower.  However, in 2008 an application was made to move the antenna to the top of the tower (23 extra feet) at an offset reduction in power, where it exists today.

The station broadcasts 24 hours a day and carries 3ABN network programming in addition to locally produced programming. The station is known for carrying the Cedar Lake SDA Church service "live" and special events like Michigan Men of Faith, and Michigan Adventist Camp meeting, which are each hosted on or adjacent to the campus.  WGLN is also the home of the nationally syndicated radio show 11th Hour Dispatch, a daily radio show devoted to highlighting current news in light of Bible prophecy and the hope of Jesus' soon return.

References

Sources 
Michiguide.com - WGLN-LP History
FccInfo.com - WGLN FCC Data

External links
WGLN-LP website
 

GLN-LP
GLN-LP
Radio stations established in 2004
Three Angels Broadcasting Network radio stations